Tungku Beach is a Brunei Investment Agency (BIA) owned beach in Kampong Tungku, Berakas 'A', Brunei-Muara, Brunei. The beach is known for fishing, picnicking and view of sunsets over the South China Sea.

In 1992, it was reported that the beach had severe sand erosion. On February 24, 2013, a beach cleaning campaign was hosted by the Ministry of Development's Lands Department.

References 

Brunei-Muara District
Beaches of Brunei